Seethagama Grama Niladhari Division is a  Grama Niladhari Division of the  Seethawaka Divisional Secretariat  of Colombo District  of Western Province, Sri Lanka .  It has Grama Niladhari Division Code 432F.

Seethagama is a surrounded by the  Avissawella, Ukwatta, Agra Pedesa, Kudagama and Weralupitiya  Grama Niladhari Divisions.

Demographics

Ethnicity 

The Seethagama Grama Niladhari Division has  a Sinhalese majority (83.7%) . In comparison, the Seethawaka Divisional Secretariat (which contains the Seethagama Grama Niladhari Division) has  a Sinhalese majority (88.2%)

Religion 

The Seethagama Grama Niladhari Division has  a Buddhist majority (79.1%) and a significant Hindu population (11.0%) . In comparison, the Seethawaka Divisional Secretariat (which contains the Seethagama Grama Niladhari Division) has  a Buddhist majority (81.5%)

References 

Grama Niladhari Divisions of Seethawaka Divisional Secretariat